Haim Biton (born 17 January 1978) is an Israeli politician. He is currently a member of the Knesset for Shas. Biton also serves as a minister in the Ministry of Education.

Biography
Biton was appointed CEO of Shas in 2014. In 2016 he took over the party's Ma'ayan Hinukh Torani school system, increasing its enrollment by 10,000 in two years. Following a complaint by Hiddush, in 2020 the Office of the Attorney General ruled that he could not be both CEO of the party and the school network.

Biton was placed ninth on the Shas list for the 2015 elections. The party won only seven seats, and when he had the opportunity to take his seat as a replacement, he declined, allowing Yigal Guetta to take his place. He subsequently turned down the opportunity to run on the party's list for the April 2019 Knesset elections. However, prior to the 2021 elections he was placed fifth on the Shas list, and was elected to the Knesset as the party won nine seats.

Biton lives in Givat Ze'ev, an Israeli settlement located north of Jerusalem.

References

External links

1978 births
Living people
Israeli Orthodox Jews
Israeli settlers
Jewish Israeli politicians
Members of the 24th Knesset (2021–2022)
Members of the 25th Knesset (2022–)
Politicians from Jerusalem
Shas politicians
Government ministers of Israel